The Einstein–Rosen metric is an exact solution of Einstein's field equation. It was derived by Albert Einstein and Nathan Rosen in 1937. It is the first exact solution of Einstein's equation that described the propagation of a gravitational wave.

This metric can be written in a form such that the Belinski–Zakharov transform applies, and thus has the form of a gravitational solution.

In 1972 and 1973, J. R. Rao, A. R. Roy, and R. N. Tiwari published a class of exact solutions involving the Einstein-Rosen metric.\

In 2021 Robert F. Penna found an algebraic derivation of the Einstein-Rosen metric.

In the history of science, one might consider as a footnote to the Einstein-Rosen metric that Einstein, for some time, believed that he had found a non-existence proof for gravitational waves.

Notes

Albert Einstein
Equations of physics
General relativity